Julio Cabrera may refer to:

Julio Cabrera (philosopher), an Argentine philosopher living in Brazil
Julio Cabrera (swimmer), a Spanish swimmer